John Mág Tighearnán, the First, (anglicised John McKiernan) was chief of the McKiernan Clan of Tullyhunco, County Cavan until his death in 1499.

Chieftainship

On the death of the previous chief, John took the chieftaincy and resided in the castle of Croaghan of the Cups (Irish- Cruachan O'Cúbhrán), now in the townland of Coolnashinny, beside the later town of Killeshandra.

In 1495 a relative died.  The Annals of Ulster for 1495 state-

Mag Tighernain ‘Ichtarach’, namely, Gormgal, son of Brian Mag Tigernain, died

Death

John died in 1499.  The Annals of Ulster for 1499 state-

Mag Tighernain of Tellach-Dunchadha, namely, John Mag Tighernain, died this year.

References

Irish lords
1499 deaths
People from County Cavan
15th-century Irish people